Teresa O'Neill is a former camogie player, captain of the Kilkenny All Ireland Camogie Championship winning team in 1974, the first for the county at senior level. She won further All Ireland senior medals in 1976, 1977 and 1981. and captained Kilkenny to victory in the 1982 National Camogie League.

Career
One of the product of the new All Ireland colleges championship of 1969 with Presentation Secondary School, Kilkenny she won club championship medals with St Paul's in 1969, 1970, 1974 and 1976.

References

External links
 Camogie.ie Official Camogie Association Website
 Wikipedia List of Camogie players

Kilkenny camogie players
Living people
Year of birth missing (living people)